The Shreveport Knights were a professional American football team that played during the 1999 season as part of the Regional Football League. They played their home games at Independence Stadium in Shreveport, Louisiana.

The team was announced as one of the league's charter members on November 12, 1998. The team was initially named the "Shreveport-Bossier City Southern Knights", however this was too long and the name was shortened. For their lone season, Fred Akers served as head coach, and Jason Martin, who had played college football for the Louisiana Tech Bulldogs, was the starting quarterback. The team's colors were purple, green, and gold.

Although the team was scheduled to play a 12-game regular season, poor attendance and sagging revenues would prove too much for the new league. After playing to a 3–4 record, the Knights were unable to use their home stadium, for financial reasons. For the eighth game of the season, adjustment by the league resulted in Shreveport being rescheduled to play on the road, but when the Knights did not travel to the game, they were assessed a forfeit. Shortly thereafter, the league ended the regular season, and the Knights did not qualify for the playoffs with their 3–5 record. After the season, the team and the league ceased operation.

1999 season schedule

 Shreveport had been scheduled to host New Orleans on June 5, but Shreveport was unable to use their stadium. The league rescheduled New Orleans to play in Mississippi on that date, and Shreveport was rescheduled to play in Ohio on June 6. A forfeit was assessed to Shreveport when they did not travel to play Ohio.

References

Further reading

External links
Remember the RFL

Southern
Regional Football League teams
American football teams established in 1998
American football teams disestablished in 1999
1998 establishments in Louisiana
1999 disestablishments in Louisiana